Illuka is a village in Ida-Viru County in Alutaguse Parish in northeastern Estonia. It was the administrative centre of Illuka Parish.

Illuka Manor
Illuka Manor was established as a manorial estate in 1657, but the presently visible main building dates from 1888. It was designed by architect Friedrich Modi. Restoration works have been carried out in the 1990s and again in 2013–2015.

Gallery

References

External links

Illuka Manor at Estonian Manors Portal

Villages in Ida-Viru County
Kreis Wierland